Susi Wurmbrand is an Austrian linguist specializing in syntax.  Wurmbrand received her PhD from the Massachusetts Institute of Technology in 1998 with a thesis titled Infinitives advised by Noam Chomsky, Alec Marantz and David Pesetsky, and her Habilitation from the University of Vienna. 

She is currently a Privatdozentin at the University of Vienna and a recurring visiting professor at Harvard University and has previously held faculty positions at McGill University and University of Connecticut.  

Wurmbrand is the Editor-in-Chief of the Journal of Comparative Germanic Linguistics, an Associate Editor of Language, and co-editor of the book series Open Generative Syntax. She is an elected member of Academia Europaea and was elected Chair of GLOW in 2022. She is a member of the Committee on Gender Equity in Linguistics of the Linguistic Society of America

Selected works

 Bobaljik, Jonathan David and Susi Wurmbrand (2005). The domain of agreement. Natural Language and Linguistic Theory 23.4: 809-865.

 Wurmbrand, Susi. (2007). How complex are complex predicates. Syntax 10: 243-288.
 Wurmbrand, Susi. (2014). Tense and aspect in English infinitives. Linguistic Inquiry 45.3: 403-447. doi: 10.1162/LING_a_00161
 Wurmbrand, Susi. (2017). Verb clusters, verb raising, and restructuring. In: The Blackwell Companion to Syntax 2, ed. by Martin Everaert and Henk van Riemsdijk. Oxford: Blackwell.
Lohninger, Magdalena, Iva Kovač, and Susi Wurmbrand. (2022). From Prolepsis to Hyperraising. Philosophies 7.2: 32.
Wurmbrand, Susi und Magdalena Lohninger. (In press). An implicational universal in complementation—Theoretical insights and empirical progress. In: Propositional Arguments in Cross-Linguistic Research: Theoretical and Empirical Issues, ed. by Jutta Hartmann and Angelika Wöllstein. Berlin: Mouton de Gruyter.

References

External links

Living people
Linguists from Austria
Women linguists
Year of birth missing (living people)
Massachusetts Institute of Technology alumni
Harvard University faculty
Academic staff of McGill University
University of Connecticut faculty